Yvan Roy may refer to:

 Yvan Roy (footballer), French football player and manager
 Yvan Roy (justice), justice in the Federal Court of Canada and former lawyer

Roy, Yvan